Aqa Baba (also Romanized as Āqā Bābā, Aga-Baba, and Āgha Bāba) is a village in Ilat-e Qaqazan-e Sharqi Rural District, Kuhin District, Qazvin County, Qazvin Province, Iran. At the 2006 census, its population was 2,373, in 558 families.

References 

Populated places in Qazvin County